James Dupré Lance (28 January 1829 – 28 March 1897) was a 19th-century Member of Parliament from Canterbury, New Zealand.

Biography
Lance was born in Boulogne, France. He first came to New Zealand in 1856 to visit his brothers.

He contested the 1866 election for the superintendency of the Canterbury Provincial Council against William Sefton Moorhouse representing the runholders; he came a distant second.

On 12 July 1865, Lance was appointed to the New Zealand Legislative Council. His membership lapsed on 18 October 1867 through absence.

References

1829 births
1897 deaths
Members of the New Zealand House of Representatives
Members of the New Zealand Legislative Council
Unsuccessful candidates in the 1890 New Zealand general election
New Zealand MPs for South Island electorates
19th-century New Zealand politicians